Rocky Mountains is a 2012 Lasse Stefanz studio album.

Track listing
 Sara Solsken
 I mina skor
 En sång från Amerika
 Heart of Stone
 Billy Paul
 Om du vill tala om kärlek
 Min rödaste ros (Autumn rose)
 Jag far från Waco
 Pretend
 I gädje och sorg
 Ett litet hur i Skåne
 Sommar, höst, vinter och vår
 När natten kommer
 Oh sha na na na

Charts

Weekly charts

Year-end charts

References 

2012 albums
Lasse Stefanz albums